Håkan is a common Swedish given name. It has a common origin with the Norwegian given name Haakon (modern Norwegian Håkon, Danish Hakon) in the Old Norse Hákon. The meaning of the name is disputed but a possible meaning is "high son" from Old Norse há- (Proto-Norse hauha-) (high) and konr (kin). 

On Swedish runestones the name is usually written Hakun and in medieval documents usually Haquon or in the Latinised versions Haqvin/Haqvinus. From the 16th century and onwards the name is usually written Håkan. Although in some western regions the name can be found as Håkon and Håka as late as in the 18th century. 

In Old East Slavic the name was written Yakun (Cyrillic: Якун). For example, the Primary Chronicle mentions the Varangian leader Yakun that arrived in Kievan Rus' in the year 1024 and fought in the Battle of Listven. The name never became popular as a Slavic name but at least two high rank Novgorod officials had the name: the posadnik Yakun Andreevich (Cyrillic: Якун Андреевич) (mentioned 1167) and the tysyatsky Yakun Namnezhich (Cyrillic: Якун Намнежич) (mentioned 1214).

An old English name form Hacon has survived in English placenames like Haconby which literally means Hacon's Village, originating through Norse settlers in England.

Some famous people by this name are
Håkan Algotsson, ice hockey player
Håkan Andersson (motorcyclist), Swedish motocross rider
Håkan Andersson (ice hockey), ice hockey executive
Håkan Bergman (born 1954), Swedish politician
Håkan Carlqvist (1954–2017), motocross rider
Håkan Dahlby, double trap shooter
Håkan Eriksson (orienteer), orienteering competitor
Håkan Eriksson (ice hockey), ice hockey player
Håkan Fredriksson, producer and musician
Håkan Hagegård, baritone
Håkan Hardenberger, trumpeter
Håkan Hellström, musical artist
Håkan Isacson, Swedish intelligence agent
Håkan Jeppsson, Swedish football executive
Håkan Juholt, politician
Håkan Jörgensen, author and freelance journalist
Håkan Karlsson, freestyle swimmer
Håkan Lans, inventor
Håkan Larsson (politician), politician
Håkan Loob, ice hockey player
Håkan Magnusson, 14th-century king of Sweden
Håkan Malmrot, swimmer
Håkan Malmström, football player
Håkan Mild, football player
Håkan Nesser, author
Håkan Persson, musical journalist
Håkan Pettersson (orienteer), orienteering competitor
Håkan Samuelsson, Swedish businessman
Håkan Sandell, poet
Håkan Spegel, 17-18th century writer
Håkan Svensson, football player
Håkan Syrén, general
Håkan Södergren, ice hockey player
Håkan Westergren, actor
Håkan Wirenstrand, keyboardist for Little Dragon
Håkan the Red, 11th-century king of Sweden

See also
Hakan, a Turkish name
Håkon, a Norwegian name

Swedish masculine given names